Beyond the Crystal Cave is a Dungeons & Dragons module set in the World of Greyhawk campaign setting. It is unusual among Dungeons & Dragons modules in that it encourages a non-violent approach (mainly parleying and true role-playing tactics) to achieving the module's goals. It is set in an old English milieu on Sybarate Isle in the Hold of the Sea Princes.

Plot summary
Beyond the Crystal Cave, is in adventure in which the player characters are hired to save a recently eloped couple from the Cave of Echoes after they fled there. The heroes must resolve the secret of the Crystal Cave to enter Porpherio's Garden, a magical place located on the island of Sybarate, where it is summer all year long. Experience points are gained by resolving with encounters intelligently without unneeded violence.

Publication history
Beyond the Crystal Cave was written by British designers Dave J. Browne, Tom Kirby, and Graeme Morris, and published by TSR in 1983 as a 32-page booklet with an outer folder.

In 2005, Kenzer and Company published a HackMaster module based on the adventure named Porpher's Enchanted Garden.  It was originally solicited as Yonder Crystal Caverns, but was changed due to substantial lateness in gaining authorisation from Wizards of the Coast. The new version required less talking and more action, making it more typical of the game system. The module was hacked by James Butler, a freelance writer from the United Kingdom.

In 2011, Wizards of the Coast updated the module for 4th Edition and added combat situations for their Encounters line of pre-made adventures.

Reception
Doug Cowie reviewed Beyond the Crystal Cave favorably for Imagine magazine. He liked the clear layout, lucid descriptions and good maps and found it a module that tries to emphasize diplomacy and intelligence over force and is "more successful than most in achieving this aim". Cowie thought that it is possible to go through the adventure "without drawing a sword" and that the main setting, Porpherio's Garden, is "highly original and well thought out". His only criticism was that some of the denizens of the garden are too prone to random attack, but he felt that was a minor point, easily altered by the DM. Overall, according to Cowie, UK1 is a "refreshing change" which "gives the talkative sort of character a place in the limelight all too often filled by the brutish fighter or the powerful MU". He concluded the review by calling it "a good package" and suggested readers should "try it for a relaxing change".

Receiving 9 out of 10 overall, the module was positively reviewed in issue No. 48 of White Dwarf magazine. The reviewer, Jim Bambra, noted that Beyond the Crystal Cave was "an interesting and thought-provoking adventure" more appropriate for characters level 3–6. Bambra mentioned that players would be "treated to a lot of interesting encounters and puzzles" after reaching Porpherio's Garden, and felt that the authors have sought to reward thoughtful solutions to dilemmas rather than hack-and-slash ones. He noted how the authors set out to discourage players from attacking everything they encounter, concluding that this module "makes a refreshing change from the more normal combat orientated adventure for its emphasis is very much on role-playing and problem solving".

Lawrence Schick, in his 1991 book Heroic Worlds felt that the UK series of modules "are typically heavier on atmosphere than their American-designed counterparts, though they do like to use those ridiculous monsters from the Fiend Folio."

Reviews
Fantasy Gamer #1 (1983)

References

Greyhawk modules
Role-playing game supplements introduced in 1983